Brachychiton grandiflorus is a tree of the genus Brachychiton native to the Cape York Peninsula in Queensland, Australia. It was described in 1988.

Notes

References

grandiflorus
Malvales of Australia
Trees of Australia
Ornamental trees
Drought-tolerant trees
Plants described in 1988